The Japan Open is an annual senior international figure skating team competition organized by the Japan Skating Federation. The current format (team event) was established in 2006. The competition is held every autumn in Japan. Invited skaters compete in the disciplines of men's and ladies' singles. Skaters perform a free program but no short. Individual results are combined for a team standing.

From 1997 until 2001, Japan Open was an individual competition in all four figure skating disciplines.

2022 
The 2022 competition was held on October 8, 2022 at the Saitama Super Arena.

Men

Ladies

Team result

2021 
The 2021 competition was held on October 2, 2021 at the Saitama Super Arena.

Like the previous year, due to the COVID-19 pandemic, the competition featured two teams composed entirely of domestic Japanese skaters, rather than the traditional three teams drawn from their respective regions (Europe, Japan, and North America) However, only senior amateur skaters were included, whereas traditionally, professional skaters are also included and the previous year featured several junior skaters as well.

Men

Women

Overall

2020
The 2020 competition was held on October 3, 2020 at the Saitama Super Arena.

Due to the COVID-19 pandemic, the competition featured two teams composed of domestic Japanese skaters only, rather than the traditional three teams drawn from their respective regions (Europe, Japan, and North America). Senior, junior, and professional skaters will be included.

Men

Ladies

Overall

2019
The 2019 competition was held on October 5, 2019 at the Saitama Super Arena.

Men

Ladies

Team result

2018
The 2018 competition was held on October 6, 2018 at the Saitama Super Arena.

Men

Ladies

Team result

2017
The 2017 competition was held on October 7, 2017 at the Saitama Super Arena.

Men

Ladies

Team result

2016
The 2016 competition was held on October 1, 2016 at the Saitama Super Arena.

Men

Ladies

Team result

2015
The 2015 competition was held on October 3, 2015 at the Saitama Super Arena.

Men

Ladies

Team result

2014
The 2014 competition was held on October 4, 2014 at the Saitama Super Arena.

Men

Ladies

Team result

2013
The 2013 competition was held on October 5, 2013.

Men

Ladies

Team result

2012
The 2012 competition was held on October 6, 2012.

Men

Ladies

Team result

2011
The 2011 competition was held on October 1, 2011 at the Saitama Super Arena.

Men

Ladies
Elizaveta Tuktamysheva replaced the injured Sarah Meier.

Team result

2010
The 2010 event was held on October 2, 2010 at the Saitama Super Arena.

Men

Ladies

Team result

2009
The 2009 event was held on October 3, 2009 at the Saitama Super Arena.

Men

Ladies

Team result

2008
The 2008 event was held on April 20, 2008 at the Saitama Super Arena.

Men

Ladies

Team result

2007
The 2007 event was held on April 29, 2007 at the Saitama Super Arena.

Men

Ladies

Team result

2006
The 2006 event was held on March 14, 2006 at the Saitama Super Arena.

Men

Ladies

Team result

References

External links
Information at GoldenSkate.com

Figure skating competitions
Figure skating in Japan